Nikolai Yurievich Moroshkin (: born 15 November 1993) is a Russian choreographer and former competitive ice dancer. With Evgenia Kosigina, he won six medals on the ISU Junior Grand Prix series and finished in the top ten at three World Junior Championships.

Career as a figure skater 
Moroshkin began skating at the age of 5 to improve his health, and took up ice dancing at 11. He began skating with Evgenia Kosigina in June 2010 after their previous partners left them. Following the tryout in his hometown of Tolyatti, Moroshkin moved to train with her in Odintsovo, near Moscow, coached by Alexei Gorshkov.

During the 2010–2011 season, Kosigina/Moroshkin won bronze at their first JGP event, in Courchevel, France. At their second event, in Dresden, Germany, they won a gold medal. These medals qualified them for the Junior Grand Prix Final, where they finished sixth. At the 2011 Russian Junior Championships, Kosigina/Moroshkin won the bronze medal and then placed sixth at the 2011 World Junior Championships.

Kosigina/Moroshkin competed in the 2011–12 Junior Grand Prix, winning silver in Latvia and bronze in Estonia. They finished fifth at the 2012 Russian Junior Championships and were not assigned to Junior Worlds.

Kosigina/Moroshkin received additional coaching from Igor Shpilband in preparation for the 2012–13 season. They won a pair of silver medals at their events in Lake Placid, New York and Zagreb, Croatia, and finished sixth at the JGP Final in Sochi, Russia. They then won silver at the 2013 Russian Junior Championships and finished sixth at the 2013 World Junior Championships.

Kosigina/Moroshkin finished fourth at the 2014 Russian Junior Championships. Initially first alternates, they joined the Russian team to the 2014 World Junior Championships after Alexandra Stepanova / Ivan Bukin withdrew.

Career as a choreographer 
In 2017-2018, Nikolai Moroshkin worked at the Olympic School St. Petersburg with the students of the coach Roman Usatov, who works as an assistant to Evgeny Rukavicin. Since 2019, Moroshkin has been working at Tamara Moskvina Figure Skating Club with single and pair skaters.

His current and former choreography clients include:

 Aleksandra Boikova / Dmitrii Kozlovskii 
 Anastasia Mishina / Aleksandr Galliamov 
 Petr Gumennik 
 Iasmina Kadyrova / Ivan Balchenko 
 Andrei Kutovoi 
 Nikolai Ugozhaev 
 Ekaterina Petushkova / Evgeni Malikov 
 Ekaterina Storublevtceva / Artem Gritsaenko 
 Evgeniia Tumanova / Georgy Kunitsa
 Maria Talalaikina

Programs 
(with Kosigina)

Competitive highlights 
CS: Challenger Series; JGP: Junior Grand Prix

With Kosigina

With Starygina

References

External links 

 

Russian male ice dancers
1993 births
Living people
Sportspeople from Tolyatti
Competitors at the 2015 Winter Universiade